Dustin D. Bell (born April 18, 1987) is a former American football defensive back. He played collegiately for UTEP Miners at University of Texas at El Paso. Bell was considered a top shutdown corner coming out of Bakersfield Junior College.

Early life
Bell attended Wilmer-Hutchins High School in Dallas, Texas, where he played football, basketball and baseball.  He was All-District in all three sports.  As a quarterback his sophomore year he led the eagles to the second round in the playoffs, where they lost a thriller against the Rusk Eagles. During his senior year at Hutch he led the Eagles to the third round in the playoffs. He had record-setting QB statistics; 1770 yards with 27 touchdowns.  He was named to the Dallas Morning News Area Top 100 list and was named a Sleeper in The Dave Campbell Texas Football book and TexPreps.com. He was MVP his senior year.  He was a three-star athlete excelling in basketball and in baseball.

College career
After high school, Bell originally signed with University of Texas at El Paso (UTEP) on a football scholarship, but he would end up attending Bakersfield Junior College where he continued his football career. He red-shirted as a freshman in 2005 season. He was considered a contender for starting cornerback his redshirt freshman season. He compiled 70 tackles and 10 interceptions in two years at Bakersfield. In December 2007, Bell committed to Kansas State University to continue his football career.

Upon graduation from Bakersfield, Bell enrolled at UTEP as a Multidisciplinary Studies major. Bell began his senior season as a backup for the Miners.

Professional career

Tri-Cities Fever
Bell played a big part in the Tri-Cities Fever, of the Indoor Football League, making it to the United Bowl.

Cleveland Gladiators
In 2012, Bell played for the Cleveland Gladiators of the Arena Football League.

New Orleans VooDoo
Bell signed with the New Orleans VooDoo for the 2013 season. Bell was reassigned before the season began.

Return to Tri-Cities
Bell re-signed with the Fever for the 2014 season.

References

UTEP Miners football players
Living people
Tri-Cities Fever players
Cleveland Gladiators players
New Orleans VooDoo players
1987 births
American football defensive backs